Greycap is a mountain in South West Tasmania.  It lies near the centre of the Frankland Range towards the impoundment Lake Pedder.  It is south east of Cleft Peak and north west of Frankland Saddle.  It is a wider than most of the other peaks on the Frankland Range, with less steep sloping sides.

See also
 Lake Pedder
 Strathgordon, Tasmania
 South West Wilderness, Tasmania

References
 Solitary 4224, Edition 1 2001, Tasmania 1:25000 Series, Tasmap

Mountains of Tasmania
South West Tasmania